The 12th Orgburo of the Russian Communist Party (Bolsheviks) was elected by the 1st Plenary Session of the  12th Central Committee, in the immediate aftermath of the 12th Congress.

Full members

Candidate members

References

Members of the Orgburo of the Central Committee of the Communist Party of the Soviet Union
1923 establishments in the Soviet Union
1924 disestablishments in the Soviet Union